Stefan Schwartz (born 1 May 1963) is an English and Canadian film and television director, writer and actor, most known for the feature film Shooting Fish and his work on the BBC's Spooks and Luther, AMC's The Walking Dead and Fear The Walking Dead as well as The Americans and The Boys.

Career

1992–2007 
Stefan Schwartz teamed up with Richard Holmes at The University of York and formed The Gruber Brothers. The duo made a number of films together including their feature film debut Soft Top Hard Shoulder (1992) starring Peter Capaldi and Phyllis Logan, which won two BAFTAs in Scotland and the London Film Festival's prestigious audience award. Building on this success in 1995 he directed Giving Tongue, shown as part of BBC2′s Wicked Women series and in 1997 wrote and directed Shooting Fish, a crime-caper comedy starring Kate Beckinsale which won several awards and made over twenty million dollars worldwide.

He then signed a three-year deal to write and direct for Miramax and wrote screenplays for them, teaming up with notable producers such as Laurence Bender and Jennifer and Suzanne Todd before directing The Abduction Club (2002) for Pathe Films.

His next film as writer/director was the romantic comedy The Best Man starring Stuart Townsend, Amy Smart and Seth Green in 2005.

2007–2015 
In television, he directed Hustle, the award-winning Spooks and The Ghost Train for Lynda La Plante before moving on to the season finale of the ground-breaking series, Luther, for the BBC. In the US he has directed several episodes of the critically acclaimed Crash with Dennis Hopper, joined the Starz series Camelot, which he directed for and also co-executive produced, and directed for the much praised Dexter series.

After finishing Being Human for Syfy Stefan directed in the final season of House and worked in New York on White Collar. He then went back to Showtime for another episode of Dexter.

Autumn 2012 he worked in Paris with Jean Reno on the series Jo, before travelling to Atlanta to shoot The Walking Dead for which he won Online Film & Television Association -  Television Award - Best Direction in a Drama Series for The Walking Dead.

Early 2013 he directed the mid-season finale of ABC's hit show Revenge, then went back to work on the final season of Dexter.

AMC then asked him back to direct Low Winters Sun in Detroit before heading back to New York to shoot the season opener of  White Collar. From there to Pittsburgh to direct Chloe Sevigny and James D'Arcy in Those Who Kill, and then to South Africa to shoot the first episode of Black Sails for Starz, (second season).

In 2014 he started the year in New York on The Americans then worked with Diane Kruger on The Bridge. He won the OFTA Television Award for Best Direction in a Drama Series  – The walking Dead.

Summer 2014 he completed an episode of the new Starz show called Flesh and Bone set in the world of ballet and written by Adam Rapp and Moira Walley-Beckett. Then Power.

2015–2018 
In 2015 Stefan returned to Cape Town to shoot two new episodes of Black Sails directing some of the most complex action/vfx sequences on television at that time. In the same year, he also directed the season finale of Fear the Walking Dead season 1 in Los Angeles, before crossing the country to direct episode 4 of The Americans season 4 in New York.

Filmography

Film

Television

As director

As actor

References

External links

1963 births
Living people
Male actors from London
English male television actors
English film directors
English television directors